KRJK (97.3 FM, "The Bull 97.3") is an American radio station licensed to serve the community of Lamont, California. The station is owned by Buck Owens Broadcasting (which is controlled by the estate of Buck Owens) and the broadcast license is held by Buck Owens Production Company, Inc.

History
In October 2009, Owens One Company, Inc., applied to the Federal Communications Commission (FCC) for a construction permit for a new broadcast radio station. The FCC granted this permit on May 5, 2010, with a scheduled expiration date of May 5, 2013. The new station was assigned call sign "KRJK" on September 20, 2011. The station began broadcast operations at 3 p.m. on September 29, 2011, carrying the small-market broadcast of Jack FM. It received its broadcast license on October 25, 2011.

On October 14, 2016, at Noon, KRJK flipped to country as "97.3 The Bull" (Now "The Bull 97.3" As Of 2022). The new format joins KUZZ/KUZZ-FM and KCWR in the Owens cluster and gives the company a monopoly on country music in the market, more than likely preventing a competitor from coming in to replace KVMX, which had flipped to Spanish ranchera music that July. KRJK will add the syndicated Bobby Bones Show for mornings starting Monday, October 17. Bones had also been carried by KVMX prior to its format change. KUZZ weekender Toni Marie will host middays, while KUZZ PD Brent Michaels adds those duties for the Bull as well. On September 29, 2017 Broadcast personality and Stand Comedian Keith Jones joined the Radio Announcer rotation working weekends and fill-ins for Middays with Toni Marie.

Former logo

References

External links

RJK
Country radio stations in the United States
Radio stations established in 2011
Mass media in Kern County, California